The National Archives of Mauritius are located in Coromandel, Mauritius. The archives were officially established in 1815, one of the earliest such institutions established in the Southern Hemisphere.

See also 
 List of national archives
 National Library of Mauritius

References

External links 
  

Mauritius
Mauritian culture
History of Mauritius